The 2022 Mohali blast was a rocket-propelled grenade attack on the intelligence wing headquarters of the Punjab Police situated in Mohali, Punjab. The attack was committed on 10 May 2022.

Background

Explosives found in Chandigarh 
On 24 April 2022, Police found a bag containing explosives near the Chandigarh's Burail Jail. The bomb disposal squad of National Security Guard (NSG) was rushed in to defuse the bomb.

Khalistan Flags 
On 9 May 2022, the main gate of the Himachal Pradesh Assembly complex were found to be tied with Khalistani flags. The walls of the complex were also scrawled with slogans. Later that evening, DGP Sanjay Kundu directed all senior police officers “to seal all inter-state borders and keep strict vigil at the places of probable hideouts” of the miscreants. The senior officials were also directed to keep the special security units, bomb disposal squads and quick reaction teams on high alert and “strengthen the security of dams, railway stations, bus stands, government buildings and vital installations”. He also cited the threat posed by the outlawed Sikhs for Justice announcing 6 June as voting date for Khalistan Referendum in Himachal Pradesh. Banned outfit Sikhs For Justice claimed the responsibility of raising the flags.

Incident 
The explosion was heard at 7:45 PM on the police building in the sector 77, Mohali.

As per the police briefing,“A minor explosion was reported at the Punjab Police Intelligence Headquarters in sector 77, SAS Nagar at around 7.45 PM. No damage has been reported. Senior officers are on the spot and an investigation is being done. Forensic teams have been called.Hours after the blast on intelligence department of Punjab police, another blast of low intensity was reported in Mohali.

Aftermath 
Pakistan was suspected of aiding the terrorists and multiple people were detained.

Reactions 
Indian National Congress told the Chief minister of Punjab to set their priorities right.

References 

2022 crimes in India
Terrorism in Punjab, India
Mohali
Terrorist incidents in India in 2022
Sikh terrorism in India
May 2022 crimes in Asia
Improvised explosive device bombings in 2022